CVRA may refer to:
Crime Victims Rights Act, 18 USC 3771, which enumerates the rights of victims of federal crimes;
California Voting Rights Act
Chippewa Valley Regional Airport